Ray Hendrick (April 1, 1929 – September 28, 1990) was an American race car driver.  He was known as "Mr. Modified" during his 36-year career in motorsports, mainly in the modified stock car racing class.

The Virginia native collected more than 700 victories in modifieds and the NASCAR Late Model Sportsman Series (later known as Busch Grand National Division). Ray Hendrick was inducted into the Virginia Sports Hall of Fame in 2012, and was inducted in the International Motorsports Hall of Fame in 2007.

Hendrick raced his famous winged No. 11 Modified coupe fielded by Jack Tant and Clayton Mitchell. Rick Hendrick (no relation) was a pit crew member on his car in the 1960s. The Richmond, Virginia star won five track championships at South Boston Speedway, four of them while competing in the NASCAR Modified division and one in the NASCAR Late Model Sportsman division.

Ray never won the National Modified Championship but finished in the Top 10 in Points nine times: 
7th in 1960,
9th in 1961,
6th in 1963,
3rd in 1964,
7th in 1965,
3rd in 1966,
5th in 1967,
6th in 1968, and
10th in 1969.

Ray also finished 8th in 1974 and 9th in 1975 in the National Late Model Sportsman Points before it became known as the Busch Grand National Division. Ray won the Modified "Race of Champions" 2 times, in 1969 on the 1-mile Langhorne Speedway asphalt and in 1975 on the Trenton Speedway 1.5-mile oval. Ray is 1st on the all-time winners list of Martinsville Speedway with 20 wins between 1963 and 1975. Next on the list is Richard Petty with 15 wins, followed by Geoff Bodine, Darrell Waltrip, and Richie Evans. Ray also won a 100 Lap National Championship race on Memorial Day Weekend of 1970 at Stafford Motor Speedway.

Hendrick was best known for his racing philosophy of racing anywhere and everywhere. Hendrick's modified career and philosophy of racing anywhere and everywhere prevented him from competing full-time in NASCAR Winston Cup. In 17 starts, he collected two top-five and six top-10 finishes.

Racing record
(Note: NASCAR didn't keep an official record on statistics for the Nationwide Series until 1982 or the Whelen Modified Tour until 1985)

Awards
Named one of NASCAR's 50 Greatest Drivers (1998)
Ranked No. 4 on All-Time Top 10 Modified Drivers list (2010)
First Inductee - Virginia Motorsports Hall of Fame 2003)
Inductee - National Motorsports Press Association Hall of Fame (1993)
Inductee - International Motorsports Hall of Fame (2007)

References

External links

The Third Turn Profile
Ultimate Racing History Profile
NASCAR.com NASCAR's 50 Greatest Drivers
NASCAR.com NASCAR's Modified All-Time Top 10
SouthBostonSpeedway.com South Boston Speedway's History

1929 births
1990 deaths
Burials in Virginia
Deaths from cancer
International Motorsports Hall of Fame inductees
NASCAR drivers
Racing drivers from Virginia
Sportspeople from Richmond, Virginia